Odivelas is a freguesia in Ferreira do Alentejo, Portugal. The population in 2011 was 542, in an area of 110.05 km2.

References

Freguesias of Ferreira do Alentejo